Archie Granot is a papercutting artist based in Israel.  He works in traditional Jewish art, including ketubahs (ketubot), mizrachs, mezuzahs, haggadah and blessings for the Jewish life cycle, etc.

Granot uses a scalpel to produce his papercut works, rather than the scissors which are more common with other artists. Granot's use of Hebrew inscriptions, handcut in calligraphic letters in his Jewish papercuts, is an integral part of his work.  Many of the texts relate to Jerusalem, Judaism and Israel.

Recent works include his Papercut Haggadah on which he worked for nearly a decade. The Haggadah consists of 55 individual works in which all elements, text as well as design, have been cut by scalpel.

Citations

Sources
 Gems in Israel: Archie Granot, Master Paper Cutter
 Archie Granot Papercuts - Cutting Edge Ketubas and Jewish Art

Year of birth missing (living people)
Living people
Israeli artists